Çarşamba Yeşilırmak Stadium, also known as the New City Stadium of Çarşamba, ( or Çarşamba Yeni Şehir Stadyumu) is a football stadium located in Çarşamba district of Samsun Province, northern Turkey. It was named after the Yeşilırmak River, which flows just east of the venue. It is the home ground of the local football team Çarşambaspor, who play in the Regional Amateur Leahue.

The stadium is situated at Çarşamba Sugar Refinery, Beyyenice, Çarşamba. Its opening took place on March 7, 2013 although not fully completed. It has a nine-lane track for athletics competitions. The stadium's seating capacity is 5,000.

International events hosted
The venue will host football events of the 2017 Summer Deaflympics.

References

Sports venues in Samsun
Football venues in Turkey
Athletics (track and field) venues in Turkey
Sports venues completed in 2013
2013 establishments in Turkey
Çarşamba